Annette Schlünz (born 23 September 1964) is a German musician and composer.

Biography
Schlünz was born in Dessau, East Germany. She studied music at the Dresden Music School from 1983 to 1987 with Udo Zimmermann and at the Academy of Arts in Berlin from 1988 to 1991 with Paul-Heinz Dittrich. She also studied with Iannis Xenakis at Darmstadt and Helmut Lachenmann in Stuttgart.

Schlünz took a teaching position at the Dresden Center for Contemporary Music in 1987 and taught at the Dresden Music School from 1987 to 1992. She went on a concert and lecture tour in South America in 1996, and also appeared in Denmark, France, Spain, the USA, and Vietnam in 2001. She has also lectured at the electronic music studio of the Academy of Arts in Berlin, the Brandenburg Colloquium, the Akademie Schloss Solitude in Stuttgart and the German Academy at the Villa Massimo in Rome. She was composer-in-residence at GRAME Centre National de Création Musicale in Lyon in 2005.

Honors and awards
Hanns Eisler Prize (1990)
Heidelberg Artists Award (1998)
Prize of the German Record Critics' Award (1999, for the EMI Classics recording of MOCCOLI)
Scholarships to Darmstadt (1990, 1992)

Works
Schlünz has composed music for stage, chamber ensemble, vocal, and multimedia works. Selected works include:

Matka (chamber opera, libretto by the composer, after Karel Capek), 1988–89
Un jour d'été (children's theater, text by Pierre Garnier), 1996
TagNachtTraumstaub (music theater, texts by the composer, Matthias Roth, Ulrike Schuster), 1999–2000
Picardie orchestra, 1992
Fadensonnen small orchestra, 1993
but you in it bass clarinet, tuba, orchestra, 2001–02
Ornithopoesie choral (text by Pierre Garnier), 1989
Tender Buttons choral (texts by Matthias Roth, Pierre Garnier), 1997
shaded piano, 1991
String Trio - il pleut doucement sur la ville violin, viola, cello, 1989
night black, the blue oboe, trombone, viola, cello, double bass, piano, percussion, 1990
pigeon blue shadows mingled flute, guitar, 1990
Et la pluie se - silent - organ, 3 percussion, 1994 (also version for organ, percussion, 2004)
Dream herb flute, clarinet, violin, viola, cello, double bass, piano, percussion, 1995
With traces of water and salt voice 11 players, 1987
Rose (text by Ingeborg Bachmann), mezzo-soprano, piano, 1988
The anti-Rose (text by Yvan Goll, Claire Goll) soprano, violin, piano, 1995
Violent customer - Gibbongesänge (text by Ulrike Schuster), voice, tape, 2001
I see the dream of water, music events for a mobile ensemble (text by Pierre Garnier), 2 voices, recorders (1 player), percussion, sculptures (by Daniel Depoutot), 1995
couloir de la solitude tape, room installation (by Thierry Aue), 2000

Her work has been recorded and issued on CD, including:
Klage Daniel Morgenroth, speaker; Friedrich Goldmann/Scharoun Ensemble (Aurophon/DZzM, 1992)
verhalten, entgleiten, entfalten Reinbert Evers, guitar (Sächsische Tonträger/DZzM, 1994)
Ach, es... Michael Vogt, tuba (RéR, 1994)
Traumkraut; Tout est rêver; Fadensonnen; Taubenblaue Schatten haben sich vermischt; Ornithopoesie; Et la pluie se mit à tomber Georg Mertens, flute; Volker Höh, guitar; Accroche-Note; Les Percussions de Strasbourg; Roland Kluttig/Thürmchen Ensemble; Klaus Bernbacher/Kammerensemble Pro Musica Nova Bremen; Roland Hayrabedian/Musicatreize Marseille (Wergo: 6539, 1998)
Zarte Knöpfe Michael Gläser/Frauenchor des Bayerischen Rundfunkchores (Deutscher Musikrat: 5, 1998)
la faulx de l'été Katja Reiser, recorders; Tan Kutay, percussion (Carpe Diem: 16256, 1999)
MOCCOLI Carola Schlüter, soprano; Ensemble Phorminx (EMI Classics: 26189, 1999)
Unaufhörliche Schlaflosigkeit Michael Vogt, tuba (Villa Massimo, 1999)
la faulx de l'été (second version) Carin Levine, flute; Stefan Blum, percussion (Radio Bremen, 2005)
ZEBRA Lenka Zupkova, electric violin (Akademie der Künste Berlin, 2005)

References

1964 births
Living people
People from Dessau-Roßlau
People from Bezirk Halle
20th-century classical composers
German music educators
Women classical composers
German classical composers
20th-century German composers
Women music educators
20th-century women composers